RCR Enterprises, LLC, doing business as Richard Childress Racing (RCR), is an American professional stock car racing team that currently competes in the NASCAR Cup Series and the NASCAR Xfinity Series. The team is based in Welcome, North Carolina, and is owned and operated by former driver Richard Childress.

Car No. 3 history

Richard Childress (1968, 1972, 1976–1981)
RCR debuted at the 1969 Talladega 500 as a 1968 Chevrolet numbered 13. Childress himself drove the car, finishing 23rd after suffering axle problems. In 1972, the team came back to run fourteen races with Childress driving again, but didn't go full-time until 1976 when he would begin using the No. 3. Childress earned 11 Top 10 finishes and finished 11th in points that year. Over the next few years, he posted many Top 10s and twice was among the highest Top 10 points earners, but he never was in serious contention to win the championship. In 1981, he decided to end his career before the season ended, and handed his No. 3 ride to the defending Winston Cup champion, Dale Earnhardt, who brought his Wrangler sponsorship with him.

Ricky Rudd (1982–1983)
After posting six Top 10's, Earnhardt left to drive for Bud Moore, and Ricky Rudd took his place for the 1982 season, with Piedmont Airlines becoming the sponsor. Rudd drove the car for both 1982 and 1983 finishing ninth in points both years, and winning twice in the latter. But after the season was over, Rudd was replaced by Earnhardt, with Wrangler back as sponsor (in perhaps an odd twist of fate, Rudd moved to Earnhardt's old ride, the No. 15 Bud Moore Engineering Wrangler-sponsored Ford Thunderbird, which actually kept its sponsorship despite Earnhardt leaving.

Dale Earnhardt (1984–2001)
This time, Earnhardt was back for good. Earnhardt would dominate the Winston Cup Series from 1986 to 1994, winning six championships during those years, with crew chiefs Kirk Shelmerdine and Andy Petree, and Goodwrench replacing Wrangler as the primary sponsor after 1987. Goodwrench executives originally wanted the car to be bright blue and white, but Childress convinced the company to run a mainly-black scheme, which would later become iconic. After an injury in 1996 that almost forced Earnhardt to miss a race, Earnhardt's performance began to slow down, and went through 1997 without a victory, causing many to speculate that he was losing his edge. The next year, he won the Daytona 500, breaking a 20 race losing streak, although he had a mostly-unspectacular year other than that. The year after that one, he was able to score wins at Talladega, as well as cause more controversy, after he spun Terry Labonte out to win a race at Bristol. In 2000, he looked like he was finally regaining his old form, winning twice and finishing runner-up to Bobby Labonte in points, and his many fans hoped he was gearing up for his record-breaking 8th championship. However, this was not to be.

Kevin Harvick and the 29 (2001–2013)
 

Following Dale Earnhardt's death on the last lap of the 2001 Daytona 500, Childress changed the number of the car from 3 to 29, inverted the original paint scheme, and tabbed his 25-year-old Busch Series driver Kevin Harvick to drive it. Harvick originally was scheduled to drive the No. 30 car part-time before going full-time in 2002; but the death of the seven-time Winston Cup champion rushed Harvick into the spotlight.

In just his third Winston Cup start, Harvick beat Jeff Gordon by mere inches (.006 seconds) to win the Cracker Barrel 500 at Atlanta Motor Speedway, dedicating the win to Earnhardt. After posting another win at Chicagoland Speedway and finishing in the top-ten in points (Despite missing a race), Harvick won NASCAR Winston Cup Rookie of the Year honors. In 2002, his infamous temper escalated after announcing on his radio he would intentionally wreck another driver during a Craftsman Truck Series race. Having been put on probation at the time for actions in an earlier-season race, in response, NASCAR benched Harvick for the next race, and Harvick was replaced during that time by Kenny Wallace. Since then, Harvick has won eight races, including the prestigious Brickyard 400 and Daytona 500 while scoring a (at the time) career-best points effort of 4th in both 2006 and 2008. Despite a win early in the 2005 season, 14th-place efforts in 2004 and 2005 proved to be frustrating, as Harvick threatened to leave the team if performance did not improve. A series of strong runs near the end of 2005 seemed to satisfy him, however, and he was back in the car in 2006 with Reese's as a new co-primary sponsor. After a somewhat slow start, Harvick hit his stride in April, with a string of Top 10 finishes, including a win at Phoenix. This helped RCR to be a dominant force in NASCAR again. After weeks of speculation as to where Kevin would drive starting in 2007, he and RCR announced a new three-year deal that he would drive for him until 2009. For 2007, the team had a significant change in sponsorship. GM Goodwrench would move to an associate sponsor role on the No. 29, while Shell Oil Company and Pennzoil took over the primary sponsorships. Harvick's 2007 season started out on a high note with a win in the Daytona 500 in a close finish with veteran Mark Martin. Harvick would score another win at the All-Star Race, holding off Jimmie Johnson. Harvick entered a slump during the summer, and was involved in a trackside altercation with Juan Pablo Montoya. However, Harvick and his team held off a struggling Dale Earnhardt Jr. to make the Chase for the Cup. Harvick's Chase performance would not be a repeat of 2006, and he would finish 10th in the points. Harvick improved in 2008, he did not win but did score 19 top tens, tying a career-best 4th in the final points standings as a repeat of 2006. Harvick won the 2009 Budweiser Shootout and finished second in the Daytona 500.

After not making the 2009 Chase for the Sprint Cup as well as finishing a dismal 19th in the final standings once again with no wins, it was expected that Harvick would leave RCR after his contract ended at the conclusion of the 2010 season. However, after a strong start to the 2010 season, leading the most laps at the  Daytona 500, consecutive runner-ups to Jimmie Johnson at Fontana & Las Vegas, and winning the 2010 Aaron's 499 at Talladega in an epic photo-finish over Jamie McMurray (his first win since 2007), Harvick signed a multi-year extension to his RCR contract in May 2010. Harvick also went on to win the Coke Zero 400 at Daytona, Carfax 400 at Michigan, and ultimately finished third in the championship standings for the 2010 season, the highest finish of his career. The team's sponsor, Shell Oil Company and Pennzoil, left after the 2010 season and joined Penske Racing. Budweiser replaced it as the car's primary sponsor beginning in the 2011 season. Harvick and the 29 team recorded three wins early in the year at Fontana, Martinsville, and Charlotte. The team's consistency kept them near the top of the standings, and they recorded a fourth win at the 26th race in Richmond. Despite the team's Chase performance being inconsistent, Harvick would finish third in points for the second year in a row. For 2012, Harvick was reunited with Shane Wilson as his crew chief at Harvick's request. However, after struggling for most of the season, Childress reunited Harvick with Martin. Harvick won once that year with Martin at Phoenix International Raceway. Despite rumors that he would leave RCR for Stewart-Haas Racing after the 2013 season, the 29 team racked up four wins during the season, and once again finished third in points. Harvick would later announce his departure from RCR to Stewart-Haas midway through the season, taking sponsors Budweiser and Jimmy Johns with him.

Austin Dillon (2014–present)

On December 11, 2013, Richard Childress announced that his eldest grandson Austin Dillon would replace Harvick for 2014 and contend for Rookie of the Year honors. In addition, the car was renumbered back to the 3, which had not been used since Dale Earnhardt's death, though RCR continued to pay for the rights to the number. New sponsor Dow Chemical and existing RCR sponsors General Mills, American Ethanol, Bass Pro Shops, and Realtree, came on to fund the return of the No. 3. Austin had run the number in prior competition, including championship seasons in the Truck and Nationwide Series, as did his younger brother Ty. The transition back to 3 was met with mixed reactions, with some fans welcoming the move with open arms, and others turning their backs on RCR and even NASCAR as a whole due to accusations of disrespect towards Earnhardt's legacy, and that the number 3 should have been retired, despite the fact that Austin got blessing to drive the number from Earnhardt's children and Chocolate Myers. In addition to the return of the number 3, Austin was set to compete with what many deemed to be the strongest rookie class in the series' history, including talented youngster Kyle Larson and his runner-up for Nationwide Series ROTY Alex Bowman, Nationwide champion Justin Allgaier and Nationwide veteran Michael Annett, and former big team development drivers Parker Kligerman, Ryan Truex, and Cole Whitt. Larson and Dillon were viewed as the top contenders for the title.

Dillon opened up 2014 with a bang, winning the pole at the season opening Daytona 500, then finishing ninth in the race after avoiding serious damage in a lap 145 wreck involving 13 cars. Though his results were not spectacular (one Top 5 and four Top 10s), Dillon's results were very consistent (0 DNF's), and finishing 20th in points, losing Rookie of the Year to Kyle Larson.

In the 2015 Coke Zero 400 at Daytona on July 5, Dillon started on the outside of the front row after qualifying was rained out, and led the first eight laps. Coming to the checkered flag, Dillon was hit in the left front tire by the spinning car of Denny Hamlin, causing him to flip into the catchfence over two rows of cars. Dillon climbed out of the car unharmed, save for a bruised tailbone and a bruise on his forearm, but five fans were injured by flying debris. Dillon was credited with a seventh-place finish. Dillon ended 2015 with one Top 5 and five Top 10s, finishing 21st in points.

In 2016, Dillon showed strength out of the box when the season started, after 6 races he had two Top 5 finishes, four Top 10s, and won his second career pole at Fontana. Dillon showed speed over the first 26 races, and with so garnered career high numbers with four Top 5s and 13 Top 10s. 

His first victory in the Cup Series came in the 2017 Coca-Cola 600 at Charlotte Motor Speedway after Jimmie Johnson, race leader, ran out of fuel with two laps remaining. On February 18, 2018, on the 17th anniversary of Dale Earnhardt's death, Austin Dillon charged back during overtime laps to win his first Daytona 500.

Dillon started the 2018 season by winning the Daytona 500. The win coincided with the 20th anniversary of Earnhardt's Daytona 500 win and qualified Dillon in the Playoffs. Dillon, however, struggled to stay consistent throughout the season with two Top 5s and five Top 10 finishes. He was eliminated in the Round of 16 after hitting the outside wall twice at the Charlotte Roval race and finished the season 13th in points.

Despite Danny Stockman coming atop the pit box in 2019 (as was Dillon's crew chief when he won the Truck and Nationwide championships) along with two poles at Auto Club and Talladega plus his first career stage win at Michigan, Dillon failed to make the Playoffs for the first time since 2015 as he fell outside the Top 20 in points with no wins and Top 5s. On October 28, 2019, Stockman announced he would step down as the crew chief of the No. 3 team at the end of the 2019 season. Justin Alexander returned as the No. 3 team's crew chief in 2020 after having served that position in the 2017 and 2018 seasons.

The 2020 season for Dillon and the No. 3 team was an improvement over the previous season. At Las Vegas, Dillon scored his first top-5 in nearly two years by finishing 4th. On July 19th, 2020 Dillon broke an 88-race winless streak by claiming his 3rd career victory at the 2020 O'Reilly Auto Parts 500 at Texas Motor Speedway. As a result, Dillon and the No. 3 team qualified for the Playoffs for the first time since the 2018 season as well as the 2021 NASCAR All-Star Race. RCR teammate Tyler Reddick also finished in 2nd-place to mark an RCR 1-2 finish for the first time since the 2011 Good Sam Club 500. On August 15, it was announced that Dillon tested positive for COVID-19, forcing him to miss the 2020 Go Bowling 235 at Daytona. Kaz Grala was announced as his replacement for the race. Grala finished 7th-place in his Cup debut. Dillon returned to racing with the team the following week at Dover. He began the playoffs with strong second and fourth-place finishes at Darlington and Richmond, respectively. However, a 32nd place finish at Las Vegas and mediocore top-20 finishes at Talladega and Charlotte Roval resulted in his elimination after the Round of 12. Dillon finished the season 11th in points, his highest since 2017.

Dillon began the 2021 season with a third-place finish at the 2021 Daytona 500, but poor finishes at the Daytona road course, Indianapolis, and Michigan, along with the lack of a win, prevented him from making the playoffs. Dillon finished the season 17th in points.

Dillon began the 2022 season with a 25th place finish at the 2022 Daytona 500. He followed it up with three top-fives and seven top-10 finishes before winning at the 2022 Coke Zero Sugar 400 at Daytona to take the final slot in the playoffs. Dillon was eliminated in the Round of 16 after being involved in a multi-car pileup at the Bristol night race.

Car No. 3 results

Car No. 8 history
Kirk Shelmerdine (1981)
The No. 8 car debuted in 1981 at Texas World Speedway as McDonald's sponsored Pontiac with Kirk Shelmerdine as the driver. He finished 33rd.
 
Daniel Hemric (2018–2019)

The No. 8 car returned in 2018 running part-time with Daniel Hemric making his Cup series debut at the spring Richmond race and the Charlotte Roval race. The car was sponsored by Smokey Mountain Herbal Snuff, who sponsored Hemric in four races of the 2017 Xfinity Series season. Hemric finished 32nd at Richmond and 23rd at Charlotte.

It was announced on December 14, 2018, that the No. 31 team would be changing numbers to No. 8 for the 2019 season. Despite winning one pole, the No. 8 was largely inconsistent and struggled to compete on a weekly basis, scoring a season-best finish of 5th at the spring Talladega race and a 25th place finish in the standings. On September 17, 2019, RCR announced that Hemric would be released from his contract at the end of the season. 

Tyler Reddick (2020–2022)

On October 2, 2019, RCR officially announced Tyler Reddick as the driver of the No. 8 for the 2020 season. The team had a vast improvement, scoring nine top 10s and a runner-up finish in the first Texas race. Reddick ended the season 19th in the standings.

The 2021 season saw Reddick become more consistent in his finishes, with one top-fives and ten top-10 finishes during the regular season. A fifth place finish at the 2021 Coke Zero Sugar 400 at Daytona enabled him to make the playoffs for the first time. Reddick was eliminated from the playoffs following the conclusion of the Round of 16 at Bristol.

Reddick began the 2022 season with a 35th place finish at the 2022 Daytona 500. At the Bristol dirt race, he battled Chase Briscoe for the lead on the closing laps when Briscoe lost control and caused both cars to slide on the final turn, leading to Reddick finishing second to Kyle Busch. At Road America, Reddick held off Chase Elliott to score his first career Cup Series win. On July 12, 2022, it was announced that Reddick had signed with 23XI Racing for a full-time Cup ride in 2024. At the Indianapolis Road Course, Reddick held off the field in overtime to win his second race of the season. Reddick was eliminated in the Round of 16 after being involved in a multi-car pileup at the Bristol night race. Despite his elimination, he scored his third career win at Texas a week later. Reddick retired from the Martinsville playoff race early, as he was not feeling well.

Kyle Busch (2023)

On September 13, 2022, it was announced that Kyle Busch would be taking over the No. 8 beginning in 2023. Busch began the season with a 19th place finish at the 2023 Daytona 500. A week later, he scored his first win with RCR and 61st career victory at Fontana.

Car No. 8 results

Car No. 27 history
 No. 30
Jeff Green & Steve Park (2001–2003)
What eventually became the No. 27 car at RCR was formed in 2001 as the No. 30 America Online-sponsored Chevrolet, with AOL signing a four-year contract. Childress initially planned to have Kevin Harvick drive the car on a limited basis during that season as part of a transition from the Busch Series to Winston Cup for 2002. After Dale Earnhardt's death, Harvick was moved into RCR's primary car and 2000 Busch Series champion Jeff Green was selected to drive the car in his place. Originally planning to debut at Atlanta in March, the team debuted at the NAPA Auto Parts 500 at California Speedway in April, with Green finishing 21st. The team qualified for six more races that season, with Green earning a pole at the Sharpie 500 at Bristol in August, and went full-time the next season as scheduled with Green behind the wheel.

Green posted six Top 10s in the 2002 season, including a career best second at Loudon in July, and finished seventeenth in points. Although the team started 2003 with a Daytona 500 pole, Green and the team failed to jell as Childress had hoped and on May 5, was fired following the first race at Richmond. In what amounted to a trade between organizations, Green was replaced by the former driver of the No. 1 car for Dale Earnhardt, Inc., Steve Park, with Green taking Park's ride at DEI. Green's firing was largely connected to an altercation between him and teammate Kevin Harvick during the Richmond race in which Harvick wrecked Green while racing for a top 10 position, igniting an already tumultuous relationship between the two drivers that went back to their competition in the Busch Series. Park would score a pole at Daytona in July and earn two Top 10s but had only six finishes inside the Top 20, ending the season 32nd in points.

Multiple Drivers (2004)
In 2004, Childress promoted 25-year-old Busch Series driver Johnny Sauter to the ride, hoping he would rise to the occasion like Harvick had in 2001. Kevin Hamlin moved over from the 31 team to serve as Sauter's crew chief. Sauter had helped secure the 2003 Busch Series owner's championship in a partial schedule with RCR, while finishing 8th in driver points. Sauter failed to score a top ten, ranked at the bottom of the Raybestos Rookie standings, and was released just 13 races into the season. After that, Dave Blaney drove the car, only skipping Infineon Raceway when Jim Inglebright took the wheel. A couple of weeks after it was announced Blaney would be in the car for rest of the year, Jeff Burton became available after parting ways with Roush Racing's No. 99 car, leaving Blaney out in the cold. Burton was signed to a multi-year contract and drove the car for the rest of the year beginning at Michigan in August. When Robby Gordon left to start his own team, Burton moved to the 31.

 No. 07
Dave Blaney (2005)

With AOL leaving as sponsor, Childress had two voids left to fill. He decided to rehire Blaney, and signed Jack Daniel's to sponsor the car, marking one of the first hard liquor sponsorships in NASCAR's history. The team also changed its number to 07 to commemorate JD's slogan "Ol' No. 7". Blaney posted just 2 top ten finishes during 2005, finishing 26th in the standings.

Clint Bowyer (2006–2008)
Blaney moved to Bill Davis Racing in 2006, while rookie Clint Bowyer was placed in the No. 07 Jack Daniels Chevrolet for RCR. In his second season, Bowyer took the first win for this team at the Sylvania 300 at Loudon. Bowyer finished third in the final standings in 2007. In 2008, Bowyer got his second win at Richmond at the Crown Royal Presents The Dan Lowry 400, and finished fifth in points.

Casey Mears (2009)
On August 23, 2008, former Hendrick Motorsports driver Casey Mears was signed to drive the 07 in 2009, with Bowyer moving to the No. 33. Mears struggled in the new ride, however, and had to take on three crew chiefs during the season. More troubling was the fact that Jack Daniel's announced on September 21, 2009 that they would be leaving RCR at the end of the year, leaving the 07 without a sponsor. Childress decided to release Mears at the end of the year,

 No. 27
Paul Menard (2011–2017)

On August 11, 2010, Paul Menard was signed to drive the fourth RCR car after he decided to leave the struggling Richard Petty Motorsports. The car was re-numbered to 27, and MENARDS Home Improvement, owned by Paul's father John Menard Jr., came on to sponsor the car in a multi-year agreement. Former TRG Motorsports partner Tom Pumpelly was listed as the owner of the No. 27 and the No. 35th place owner's points were given to Menard to guarantee a spot in the first five races. The 27 opened the season with a 9th-place finish at the Daytona 500. Menard would go on to win the Brickyard 400 at the Indianapolis Motor Speedway on July 31, leading a total of 21 laps and using a fuel mileage gamble to take the victory. It was the first and only career win for Menard. The victory also made Paul eligible for the $3 million Sprint Summer Showdown. Menard spent most of the season flirting with the top 12 in points. Menard and the 27 team would end up finishing 17th in points.

In 2012 and 2013, Menard's results were similar, scoring 9 top 10s in both seasons and finishing 16th and 17th in points respectively, with only three DNF's over the two years. At the 2013 season finale at Homestead Miami Speedway, Menard was involved in a freak incident, when his right rear wheel caught fire due to rubber from a previous tire issue being wrapped around the rear axle and igniting from a cut brake line. The tire proceed to explode on pit road, sending black smoke in all directions, and ending their day. ESPN analyst Andy Petree described it as "like a bomb went off" during the telecast of the race. In a less infamous incident at Darlington in April of the next year, Menard blew a right front tire and slammed the turn 2 wall. Once again on pit road, rubber collected under the car (in addition to fluid leaking from the engine) caught fire and exploded, ending the 27 car's race.

Menard returned to the 27 for 2014, with the car running schemes more oriented towards the associate sponsors of MENARDS featured on the hood of the car. Six races prior to the Chase for the Sprint Cup at Indy in July, Menard was involved in an incident with part-time driver Juan Pablo Montoya, sending Menard into the turn 3 wall and relegating him to a 34th-place finish. The incident upset both driver and crew (Menard was dropped to 16th in points). After the fall Richmond race, Menard remained winless and ranked 20th in points.

Menard made his first chase appearance in 2015, but got eliminated after the first round and finished 15th in the final standings. After two mediocre seasons, (25th in 2016, 23rd in 2017), Menard left the team to go race for Wood Brothers Racing for the 2018 season. The No. 27 team was shut down after the 2017 season, with the team's charter being leased and eventually sold to StarCom Racing.

Car No. 27 results

Car No. 31 history
Beginnings (1978, 1993)
For over a decade, car No. 31 was Childress's R&D car. It debuted in 1978 at North Carolina Speedway with Bobby Wawak as the driver, finishing 27th. The car wasn't seen again until 1993 with Earnhardt's longtime friend Neil Bonnett driving at Talladega Superspeedway. In this race, Bonnett, already on a comeback, was involved in a horrifying accident, but made it out okay. After driving another race in the season finale at Atlanta Motor Speedway as a start and park entry that year for RCR, Bonnett died testing Phoenix Racing's No. 51 Country Time Lemonade car for the 1994 Daytona 500.

Mike Skinner (1996–2001)

In 1996, the car returned with defending Craftsman Truck Series champion Mike Skinner driving with Realtree sponsoring the car in four of the five races it ran. The team finally ran full-time in 1997, with Skinner driving and Lowe's signing a five-year deal to sponsor the entry. The move made RCR a multi-car operation for the first time. Skinner won the pole position for both of the races at Daytona, and defeated what has turned out to be a very scant field of drivers for Rookie of the Year. He suffered some injuries in 1998, and Morgan Shepherd and Childress' son-in-law Mike Dillon filled in for him. Teamed with crew chief Larry McReynolds, 1999 was his best season ever, winning the pole position twice, and finished tenth in points after being the championship leader at one point earlier in the year. Skinner would finish 12th in points in 2000, earning his career-best finish of second at Talladega. However, Skinner was never able to win a points-paying race, although he won two exhibition races in Japan, at Suzuka and Twin Ring Motegi, respectively, as well as some other non-point events.

Robby Gordon (2001-2004)

For the 2001 season, McReynolds was replaced by Royce McGee. In 2001, Skinner suffered a concussion and a broken ankle in an early race crash at the inaugural race at Chicagoland in July. Robby Gordon was named his replacement in the No. 31 car. Gordon struggled heavily, missing two races and failing to post a finish better than 25th in his first four starts for the team. During this time in August, Cingular Wireless (then the sponsor of Chip Ganassi Racing's No. 01 car) was announced as the new sponsor for 2002 signing a four-year deal, with Lowe's not renewing their contract and moving to Hendrick Motorsports. Skinner returned at Bristol, but he just wasn't the same. Skinner was released from the final year of his contract in August, and left the team after Dover in September to have season-ending surgery. Gordon once again took his place at Kansas.

At Watkins Glen, Gordon was dominating the race when the telemetry box in his car used by NBC Sports burst into flames, injuring a crew member and ending the No. 31's day. In spite of struggles, it was announced in November 2001 that Gordon would drive the car full-time the next year. Robby Gordon continued driving the car for the final races of 2001, DNQing twice (at Charlotte and Atlanta), and missing one race that Jeff Green drove in his place. In the rescheduled season finale at New Hampshire, Robby Gordon was engaged in a closing-laps battle with eventual champion Jeff Gordon. With 16 laps to go, leader Jeff Gordon  was stuck behind the 12th-place No. 77 car of Robert Pressley trying to stay on the lead lap, with Robby right on his tail. In the middle of turns three and four, Robby gave a bump to Jeff Gordon while he had slowed down to try to pass the lapped car of Mike Wallace, sending him into Wallace's No. 12 car and inflicting damage on the 24 car. Jeff was black-flagged while attempting to retaliate under caution, and Robby went on to earn a controversial first career victory. It was also the 31 car's first victory.

Armed with a big surge of momentum and a new sponsor in Cingular Wireless, Gordon had five top-ten finishes and finished 20th in points in 2002. 2003 was even better, as he swept both road course events and finished 16th in points. After his performance dipped down in 2004, Gordon decided to leave and start his own team, the No. 7 with Robby Gordon Motorsports, and Jeff Burton was tabbed as his replacement.

Jeff Burton (2005–2013)

2005 was Jeff Burton's first full year at RCR, and he had six top-tens and three top-fives for the year, including a third in the Subway Fresh 500 at Phoenix in April and a second-place finish in the Sharpie 500 at Bristol Motor Speedway.
 
In 2006, Burton won the pole for four races, bringing his total number of career pole wins to six. The four pole wins were for the Daytona 500, the USG Sheetrock 400 at Chicagoland Speedway, the Brickyard 400 at Indianapolis Motor Speedway, and the GFS Marketplace 400 at Michigan International Speedway. Prior to qualifying for the Daytona 500, Burton was extremely enthusiastic about the improvements to RCR as a whole. The Allstate 400 pole gave Richard Childress Racing the front row as teammate Clint Bowyer recorded the second fastest time. Burton's best finish came in the Chicagoland race where he recorded a second-place finish. He led the most laps at Indianapolis and Bristol's Sharpie 500, setting the pace for more than half the race. In the Busch Series, he won at Atlanta Motor Speedway and Dover International Speedway, breaking his four-year winless streak in any series. Burton won the Dover 400 at Dover International Speedway allowing him to take the points lead. However, a series of relatively poor finishes in subsequent races, including a flat tire at Talladega while running in the top five and an engine failure at Martinsville, eliminated Burton from contention for the championship.

Burrton won the Samsung 500 (Texas) on April 15, 2007, driving the Prilosec OTC-sponsored Chevrolet, passing Matt Kenseth on the final lap, making him the first driver with multiple wins at Texas Motor Speedway. He finished tied for 7th in the 2007 standings and finished the year in 8th
 
Burton came very close to winning the 50th running of the Daytona 500. He qualified 36th and by the end of the race had worked his way up in the field. He led prior to the race's final caution, but when the green flag dropped with four laps to go, lost several positions and wound up finishing 13th.
 
Burton won the 2008 Food City 500 at Bristol Motor Speedway. Following contact between Kevin Harvick and Tony Stewart, Burton passed both Harvick and Stewart for the 2nd position. On the ensuing restart Burton passed Denny Hamlin coming off of Turn 2 to win the Food City 500 and finishing off a sweep of the podium for Richard Childress Racing. Burton also won the 2008 Bank of America 500 at Lowe's Motor Speedway. Burton took the lead from Greg Biffle with just over 70 laps to go. During the final round of pit stops Burton took fuel only and held off a hard charging Jimmie Johnson for his first multiple win season since 2001. Burton improved to sixth in points

Burton had a new sponsor on the No. 31 beginning in 2009, after Caterpillar Inc., his brother Ward Burton's former sponsor at Bill Davis Racing, was signed through 2011. Burton was expected to make a run for the championship. Burton's best finish that year was a pair of second-place finishes in the final two races at Phoenix and Homestead.

In 2010, he rebounded but he had still not won a race, he finished second in both Dover races. He nearly won the fall Martinsville but a flat tire with 15 laps to go gave Denny Hamlin the win. A couple weeks later he and Jeff Gordon got into a wreck long after the caution was out. Burton walked up the track to confront Gordon and the two got into a shoving match. Burton finished 12th in the final standings. Afterwards, Burton assumed responsibility for the incident, stating he was attempting to catch up to Gordon, but was unable to see in the sunlight's glare.
 

In 2011, Burton opened the season by winning the second Gatorade Duel qualifying race, edging out his Richard Childress Racing teammate Clint Bowyer. After that, Burton's season went downhill. He was leading the Daytona 500 halfway when his engine gave out. He nearly won the Coca-Cola 600 but got spun out on the final restart. Though wanting another caution, the yellow flag never came out because NASCAR wanted to see the race finish under green, and Dale Earnhardt Jr. was leading when the accident occurred. His teammate Kevin Harvick passed Earnhardt Jr. within the last 500 yards of the race, because Dale Jr. ran out of gas. This led to controversy because fans were speculating that NASCAR wanted Earnhardt to win and go back to victory lane in the first time in three years. Burton's first top 10 came in the twenty first race at Watkins Glen International. Burton had a strong run at the fall race at Talladega, leading on the last lap and out of turn four being pushed by Clint Bowyer. At the tri-oval, Bowyer slingshotted to Burton's outside and won by a hood, giving Richard Childress his 100th win as a team owner, Bowyer redeeming his 0.002 second loss to Jimmie Johnson at the track in the spring. In 2012, Burton gained the sponsorship in Wheaties, BB&T and EnerSys. The 31 team also switched crew chiefs too, and Drew Blickensderfer became the crew chief. After a dismal 2012, Blickensderfer was released 4 races early and Luke Lambert became Burton's crew chief in 2013. Shane Wilson became interim crew chief until the end of 2012. Burton had six Top 10s in 2012 including a dramatic 2nd-place finish at Daytona in July after saving his car from spinning on the final lap. At the AdvoCare 500 at Phoenix International Raceway, Burton would make his 1,000th career NASCAR start, the sixth driver in NASCAR history to do so.
 
On September 4, 2013, Richard Childress Racing announced that Burton would not be returning to RCR in 2014.

Ryan Newman (2014–2018)

In September 2013, Burton announced that he would be stepping out of the No. 31 at the end of the season due to a lack of additional sponsorship. On September 9, it was announced that Ryan Newman will drive the No. 31 beginning in 2014, bringing sponsor Quicken Loans with him from Stewart-Haas Racing for 12 races. Kevin Harvick had transferred to Stewart-Haas Racing, Newman's previous team, essentially meaning the two drivers were switching teams, although they did not end up in the same rides.

In 2015, Newman had a productive season. He picked up a few top fives in the spring, but his season changed. After the 2015 Auto Club 400, Newman's team was penalized with one of the harshest penalties ever. Key members of his team including Lambert were suspended for six races and fined $75,000 and stripped of 75 driver and owner points for having intentionally altered their tires. Newman appealed the penalty which got slightly reduced on appeal but the suspensions were upheld.

Newman struggled throughout the 2016 season, only managing 10 top tens and 2 top fives. He finished off the season with a poor 25th-place finish at Homestead Miami Speedway. Newman finished 11th in the 2016 Daytona 500. This was an improvement from 2015's finish which was a 38th-place finish.

In 2017, RCR re-signed Newman to a multi-year contract. On March 19, 2017, Newman won at Phoenix, breaking a four-year winless streak for himself and a nine-year winless streak for the No. 31 team. The team, however, struggled throughout the 2018 season, failing to make the Playoffs and finishing 17th in the points standings. On September 15, 2018, Newman announced he will not return to RCR in 2019.

Tyler Reddick (2019)
In September 2018, RCR announced that newcomer Daniel Hemric will race full-time in the No. 31, replacing Newman beginning in 2019 while competing for 2019 Rookie of the Year honors. On December 14, 2018, it was announced that the No. 31 car would be changing to No. 8 starting with the 2019 season. In February 2019, RCR announced that the No. 31 would enter in the Daytona 500 with the car being driven by rookie Tyler Reddick.

Car No. 31 results

Car No. 33 history

As the 90 (2003)
What is now the No. 33 car started as the No. 90 car in 2003. RCR entered the No. 90 Chevrolet in the fall Talladega race with John Andretti driving. The car was sponsored by AOL 9.0 and was numbered 90 for marketing purposes. Ron Hornaday Jr. ran the No. 90 in the season-ending Ford 400 with Childress Vineyards on the hood.

As the 33 (2004-2015)
In 2004, it was announced that Kerry Earnhardt would drive the car (renumbered to 33) in five NASCAR Nextel Cup races. Mike Skinner would run the car in the Daytona 500, finishing 22nd. Earnhardt drove the car in the other three restrictor plate races with Bass Pro Shops sponsoring, getting his best finish of 24th. He attempted all of the restrictor plate races again in 2005, finishing 17th at Talladega. In addition, road course ringer Brian Simo brought home a 10th-place finish at Infineon Raceway. Clint Bowyer (Childress' Busch Series driver) made his Nextel Cup debut in this car with a Sylvania sponsorship at Phoenix in April 2005. Scott Wimmer ran the season finale in 2005, attempted two races in 2006 (making one start), and only made one start out of seven attempts in 2007. On May 2, 2008, Wimmer attempted but failed to qualify for the 2008 Crown Royal presents the Dan Lowry 400 at Richmond. Wimmer had sponsorships from Holiday Inn and Camping World/RVs.com. Ken Schrader and Mike Wallace ran one race apice in 2008.

Clint Bowyer (2009–2011)

RCR expanded to 4 full-time NASCAR Cup Series teams in 2009 with sponsorship from General Mills' Cheerios and Hamburger Helper sponsorships on the No. 33 Chevrolet. On August 23, 2008, RCR driver Clint Bowyer was announced as the driver of the No. 33 General Mills-sponsored Chevrolet Impala SS for the 2009 season. Casey Mears took over Bowyer's previous car, the No. 07 Jack Daniel's-sponsored Chevrolet Impala SS. In his first race in the car, Bowyer finished fourth in the 2009 Daytona 500. However, the team failed to win in 2009.

The Hartford joined the team as an additional a sponsor of the No. 33 during 2010, and Bowyer's consistency improved markedly. The team had a fairly solid season in 2010.

However, in 2011, the team struggled with consistency. With the departure of Bowyer to Michael Waltrip Racing for 2012, General Mills moved its sponsorship over to the No. 31 team, leaving the No. 33 team without a driver or sponsor.

Circle Sport (2012–2015)

The No. 33 began 2012 with the intent of running only as long as sponsorship would allow. Kroger and General Mills sponsored at the Daytona 500 with Elliott Sadler driving. Brendan Gaughan drove the next four races with his family's South Point Hotel, Casino & Spa on the car. Elliott's brother Hermie Sadler then drove at Martinsville with Anderson's Maple Syrup sponsoring. This would be the last race for the 33 under RCR control, fielded as a collaboration with the new team ownership (see below).

In April 2012, Childress announced that he sold the No. 33 to Joe Falk and Mike Hillman, Sr., who had fielded the No. 40 twice earlier in the season but had yet to qualify for a race. However, they kept the number 33, with the team assuming the name Circle Sport. Falk and Hillman took over the car at Texas in April. The transfer allowed RCR to field the number for their entries on limited occasions. In the first of these occasions, Austin Dillon ran the car under the RCR banner with American Ethanol, finishing 24th at the June Michigan race. For 2013, the same arrangement continued, with Dillon running the No. 33 as an RCR entry for selected races including Daytona, Michigan, and Indianapolis. Brian Scott ran an RCR car in his Cup debut at the 2013 Bank of America 500, finishing 27th.
 		 	
In 2014, RCR ran the 33 in the first two races of the season with Scott and his family's Whitetail Club. Scott finished fifth in his Daytona Duel to earn a spot in the Daytona 500, then finished 25th in the race after several accidents. Scott ran the next race at Phoenix, starting and finishing 32nd. Scott was involved in a controversy in the fifth race of the season at Fontana, when he spun out Cup Series regular Aric Almirola, who expressed displeasure at Scott's driving and source of sponsorship after getting out of the car. Scott would finish 35th in that race. Brian then won the pole at the spring Talladega race, his first career Cup pole. Scott would not lead any laps, however, and finished 42nd after crashing out. 2000 Cup Champion Bobby Labonte, who was doing test driving for RCR, drove the same car at the summer Daytona race, under the Circle Sport banner. The car again had speed in qualifying, timing in 4th. Labonte would contend for the lead for much of the race but finish 26th after being swept up in the Big One. Richard Childress' younger grandson Ty Dillon drove at Atlanta and Phoenix in the fall, with sponsorship from Rheem, Realtree and Charter Communications.

Ty Dillon attempted the 2015 Daytona 500 in the No. 33 for RCR with Cheerios and Kroger sponsoring. Dillon qualified for the Daytona 500 and finished 28th. Brian Scott qualified for Atlanta in the No. 33 (under the Circle Sport banner) the next week, but gave up his seat to HScott Motorsports after their driver Michael Annett missed the race. Under NASCAR rules, Falk would receive owner's points. Scott raced the next week at Las Vegas for RCR, finishing 13th, and also ran well two races later at Fontana before finishing 27th. Scott made the field at Talladega in May, but finished last after a blown engine and subsequent crash collecting Michael Waltrip. Dillon ran the car at Kansas in May promoting SpongeBob SquarePants character Plankton. Scott drove the car at Dover with Acme Markets and Kraft, finishing 36th after a crash with Kyle Busch. Dillon returned at Pocono and Michigan in June with Yuengling and Nexium sponsoring in respective events. Scott returned with Shore Lodge at the July Daytona race and the Brickyard 400. The 33 shut down at the end of the season.

Austin Hill (2022)
On August 2, 2022, RCR announced that Austin Hill would make his Cup Series debut in the No. 33 at Michigan.

Car No. 33 results

 From 2012-2015, RCR shared their owner points with Joe Falk's team, Circle Sport. The 33 car ran races not raced by RCR under the ownership of Falk, thus making their owner's points for the 33 reflective of an entire 36 race season rather than the part time schedule RCR ran.

Car No. 98 history
Austin Dillon made his Cup Series debut at Kansas in October 2011, with sponsorship from Camping World on the No. 98 Chevrolet. The car was fielded in association with music executive Mike Curb and promoted the Ronald Reagan Centennial Celebration. The entry was allowed because of NASCAR's policy that allows teams to field a fifth car if it is fielded for a rookie in seven or less races.

Car No. 98 Results

References

External links
 Official website for Richard Childress Racing
 

1969 establishments in North Carolina
American auto racing teams
Companies based in North Carolina
Dale Earnhardt
Entertainment companies established in 1969
Kevin Harvick
Kyle Busch
NASCAR Cup Series
NASCAR teams